Karolína Plíšková was the defending champion, but she chose to compete in Tianjin instead.

Anastasia Pavlyuchenkova won the title, defeating Anna-Lena Friedsam in the final, 6–4, 6–3.

Seeds

Draw

Finals

Top half

Bottom half

Qualifying

Seeds

Qualifiers

Lucky loser
  Johanna Konta

Draw

First qualifier

Second qualifier

Third qualifier

Fourth qualifier

References 
 Main draw
 Qualifying draw

Generali Ladies Linz - Singles
Generali Ladies Linz Singles